Gyula Káté (born February 3, 1982 in Budapest, Hungary) is a Hungarian amateur boxer best known for winning two bronze medals at European Championships and one at the World Championships.

Career
In 2000 he won the World Junior Championships against Boris Georgiev.

At the 2003 World Championships he lost in the semifinal to Mario Kindelan and won lightweight bronze.

In 2004 he won lightweight bronze at the European Championships.  At the Olympics he lost his first match against Jong Sub-Baik.  At the 2004 World University Boxing Championships he won the 64 kg title, the start of his competing at junior welterweight.

At the 2007 World Championships he beat Myke Carvalho but lost early to Gennadiy Kovalev.

In 2006 he won a bronze medal at the European Amateur Boxing Championships after he was beaten in the semifinals by Russia's Oleg Komissarov.

He qualified for the 2008 Olympics at Light-welterweight by beating Lithuanian boxer Egidijus Kavaliauskas in the semifinal of a European qualifying tournament.  At the 2008 Olympics he lost his first bout 5:9 to Irish Johnny Joyce.

At the 2012 Summer Olympics, he lost to Vincenzo Mangiacapre.

References

External links
Olympic qualifier
AIBA results for Olympic qualification.
2000 World Juniors
World 2003
2004 Euro
2006 Euro

Living people
1982 births
Lightweight boxers
Light-welterweight boxers
Boxers at the 2004 Summer Olympics
Boxers at the 2008 Summer Olympics
Boxers at the 2012 Summer Olympics
Olympic boxers of Hungary
Martial artists from Budapest
Hungarian male boxers
AIBA World Boxing Championships medalists